The Grangefield Ground is a multi-purpose sport grounds located in Grangefield, Stockton-on-Tees, England. It focuses on cricket and rugby union. It is the home of Stockton Cricket Club since 1892 and Stockton Rugby Football Club since 2015. The rugby club came after a 67-year stay at the Norton Sports Complex.

Grounds

Rugby

Stockton Rugby Football Club moved to The Grangefield Ground in 2015. The lease included the use of the indoor facility (which includes four changing rooms and a multi-purpose sports hall), and (initially) three rugby union pitches behind The Grangefield Academy school (which is The Grangefield Ground) whereas the clubhouse is located over the road on (community partner) Stockton Cricket Club's ground, where another 2 junior rugby union pitches are located. The ground's set-up is similar to the club's previous ground located in Norton. The Academy shares the rugby pitches, which are used for physical education purposes.

Two more existing rugby pitches and changing rooms, part of a five-acre site, are located behind the pitches, which Stockton leased in 2019, with plans in place to develop the site for Woman and Girls rugby. The site became available for use from 31 October, with the changing rooms being modified with Stockton's club colours and badge being painted into exterior walls, the pitches were marked and new posts were added.

See also
List of cricket grounds in England and Wales

References

External links
 Stockton RFC
 Stockton CC
Grangefield Road at ESPNcricinfo
Grangefield Road at CricketArchive

Sport in Stockton-on-Tees
Sports venues completed in 1894
Sports venues in Stockton-on-Tees
Sports venues in County Durham
Durham County Cricket Club
Cricket grounds in County Durham
Rugby union stadiums in England